The Kagayanen language is spoken in the province of Palawan in the Philippines. It belongs to the Manobo subgroup of the Austronesian language family, and is the only member of this subgroup that is not spoken on Mindanao or nearby islands.

Distribution
Kagayanen is spoken in the following areas.
Palawan Province: Cagayancillo Island between Negros and Palawan
Palawan coastal communities
southern Palawan: Balabac Island
northern Palawan: Busuanga and Coron
other areas around the Philippines: Iloilo Province; Silay, Negros; Manila; Quezon and Rizal areas

Phonology

 occurs only in loan words, proper names, or in words that have  in the cognates of neighboring languages.
Outside of loanwords,  becomes  between vowels.

It is otherwise .

Notes

References

Manobo languages
Languages of Palawan